Explorations may refer to:

The plural of exploration
Explorations (TV series), a BBC documentary broadcast in 2003 and 2004
Explorations (Bill Evans album), 1961
Explorations (Louis Bellson album), 1964